Calvin Louis Faucher (born September 22, 1995) is an American professional baseball pitcher for the Tampa Bay Rays of Major League Baseball (MLB). He made his MLB debut in 2022.

Amateur career
Faucher attended Hilltop High School in Chula Vista, California. He played for the school's baseball team as a pitcher. In 2012, he had a 1.05 earned run average (ERA) as a junior. Faucher played college baseball at the University of California, Irvine. In 2016, he played collegiate summer baseball with the Yarmouth–Dennis Red Sox of the Cape Cod Baseball League, where he was used as a closer and helped the club win its third consecutive league title.

Professional career
The Minnesota Twins selected Faucher in the 10th round of the 2017 MLB draft with the 286th pick. Faucher made his professional debut with the rookie-level Elizabethton Twins. In 2018, Faucher split the season between the High-A Fort Myers Miracle and the Single-A Cedar Rapids Kernels, pitching to a cumulative 4.09 ERA with 62 strikeouts in 36 games between the two teams. The following season, Faucher returned to Fort Myers, logging a 4.42 ERA with 61 strikeouts in 34 games. Faucher did not play in a game in 2020 due to the cancellation of the minor league season because of the COVID-19 pandemic. Faucher began the 2021 season with the Double-A Wichita Wind Surge, but struggled to a 7.04 ERA in 19 games.

Tampa Bay Rays
On July 22, 2021, Faucher was traded to the Rays, alongside Nelson Cruz, for Joe Ryan and Drew Strotman. Faucher improved his performance down the stretch, tossing 4.2 scoreless innings in 2 games for the Double-A Montgomery Biscuits and recording a 1.77 ERA in 20.1 innings across 11 contests for the Triple-A Durham Bulls. He was selected to the 40-man roster following the season on November 19, 2021. On May 9, 2022, Faucher was promoted to the Rays' major league roster. He made his major league debut that day.

References

External links

1995 births
Living people
Sportspeople from Chula Vista, California
Baseball players from California
Major League Baseball pitchers
Tampa Bay Rays players
UC Irvine Anteaters baseball players
Yarmouth–Dennis Red Sox players
Fort Myers Miracle players
Elizabethton Twins players
Cedar Rapids Kernels players
Wichita Wind Surge players
Montgomery Biscuits players
Durham Bulls players